Aluminium-26 (26Al, Al-26) is a radioactive isotope of the chemical element aluminium, decaying by either positron emission or electron capture to stable magnesium-26. The half-life of 26Al is 7.17 (717,000) years. This is far too short for the isotope to survive as a primordial nuclide, but a small amount of it is produced by collisions of atoms with cosmic ray protons.

Decay of aluminium-26 also produces gamma rays and x-rays. The x-rays and Auger electrons are emitted by the excited atomic shell of the daughter 26Mg after the electron capture which typically leaves a hole in one of the lower sub-shells.

Because it is radioactive, it is typically stored behind at least  of lead. Contact with 26Al may result in radiological contamination necessitating special tools for transfer, use, and storage.

Dating
Aluminium-26 can be used to calculate the terrestrial age of meteorites and comets. It is produced in significant quantities in extraterrestrial objects via spallation of silicon alongside beryllium-10, though after falling to Earth, 26Al production ceases and its abundance relative to other cosmogenic nuclides decreases. Absence of aluminium-26 sources on Earth is a consequence of Earth's atmosphere obstructing silicon on the surface and low troposphere from interaction with cosmic rays. Consequently, the amount of 26Al in the sample can be used to calculate the date the meteorite fell to Earth.

Occurrence in the interstellar medium

The gamma ray emission from the decay of Al-26 at 1809 keV was the first observed gamma emission from the galactic center. The observation was made by the HEAO-3 satellite in 1984.

The isotope is mainly produced in supernovas ejecting many radioactive nuclides in the interstellar medium. The isotope is believed to provide enough heat to small planetary bodies so as to differentiate their interiors, such as has been the case in the early history of the asteroids 1 Ceres and 4 Vesta. This isotope also features in hypotheses regarding the equatorial bulge of Saturn's moon Iapetus.

History
Before 1954, the half-life of aluminium-26 was measured to be 6.3 seconds. After it was theorized that this could be the half-life of a metastable state (isomer) of aluminium-26, the ground state was produced by bombardment of magnesium-26 and magnesium-25 with deuterons in the cyclotron of the University of Pittsburgh. The first half-life was determined to be in the range of 106 years.

The Fermi beta decay half-life of the aluminium-26 metastable state is of interest in the experimental testing of two components of the Standard Model, namely, the conserved-vector-current hypothesis and the required unitarity of the Cabibbo–Kobayashi–Maskawa matrix. The decay is  superallowed. The 2011 measurement of the half life of 26mAl is 6346.54 ± 0.46(statistical) ± 0.60(system) milliseconds. In considering the known melting of small planetary bodies in the early Solar System, H. C. Urey noted that the naturally occurring long-lived radioactive nuclei (40K, 238U, 235U and 232Th) were insufficient heat sources. He proposed that the heat sources from short lived nuclei from newly formed stars might be the source and identified 26Al as the most likely choice. This proposal was made well before the general problems of stellar nucleosynthesis of the nuclei were known or understood. This conjecture was based on the discovery of 26Al in a Mg target by Simanton, Rightmire, Long & Kohman.

Their search was undertaken because hitherto there was no known radioactive isotope of Al that might be useful as a tracer. Theoretical considerations suggested that a state of 26Al should exist. The life time of 26Al was not then known; it was only estimated between 104 and 106 years. The search for 26Al took place over many years, long after the discovery of the extinct radionuclide 129I (by Reynolds (1960, Physical Review Letters v 4, p 8)) which showed that contribution from stellar sources formed ~108 years before the Sun had contributed to the Solar System mix. The asteroidal materials that provide meteorite samples were long known to be from the early Solar System.

The Allende meteorite, which fell in 1969, contained abundant calcium–aluminium-rich inclusions (CAIs). These are very refractory materials and were interpreted as being condensates from a hot solar nebula. then discovered that the oxygen in these objects was enhanced in 16O by ~5% while the 17O/18O was the same as terrestrial. This clearly showed a large effect in an abundant element that might be nuclear, possibly from a stellar source. These objects were then found to contain strontium with very low 87Sr/86Sr indicating that they were a few million years older than previously analyzed meteoritic material and that this type of material would merit a search for 26Al. 26Al is only present today in the Solar System materials as the result of cosmic reactions on unshielded materials at an extremely low level. Thus, any original 26Al in the early Solar System is now extinct.

To establish the presence of 26Al in very ancient materials  requires demonstrating that samples must contain clear excesses of 26Mg /24Mg which correlates with the ratio of 27Al/24Mg. The stable 27Al is then a surrogate for extinct  26Al.  The different 27Al/24Mg ratios are coupled to different chemical phases in a sample and are the result of normal chemical separation processes associated with the growth of the crystals in the CAIs. Clear evidence of the presence of 26Al at an abundance ratio of 5×10−5  was shown by Lee, et al.  The value  (26Al/27Al ~ 5) has now been generally established as the high value in early Solar System samples and has been generally used as a refined time scale chronometer for the early Solar System. Lower values imply a more recent time of formation. If this 26Al is the result of pre-solar stellar sources, then this implies a close connection in time between the formation of the Solar System and the production in some exploding star. Many materials which had been presumed to be very early (e.g. chondrules) appear to have formed a few million years later (Hutcheon & Hutchison). Other extinct radioactive nuclei, which clearly had a stellar origin, were then being discovered.

That 26Al was present in the interstellar medium as a major gamma ray source was not explored until the development of the high-energy astronomical observatory program. The HEAO-3 spacecraft  with cooled Ge detectors allowed the clear detection of 1.808 Mev gamma lines from the central part of the galaxy from a distributed of 26Al source. This represents a quasi steady state inventory corresponding to two solar masses of 26Al was distributed . This discovery was greatly expanded on by observations from the Compton Gamma Ray Observatory using the COMPTEL telescope in the galaxy. Subsequently, the 60Fe lines (1.173 & 1.333 Mev) were also detected showing the relative rates of decays from 60Fe to 26Al to be 60Fe/26AL~0.11.

In pursuit of the carriers of 22Ne in the sludge produced by chemical destruction of some meteorites, carrier grains in micron size, acid-resistant ultra-refractory materials (e.g. C, SiC) were found by E. Anders & the Chicago group. The carrier grains were clearly shown to be circumstellar condensates from earlier stars and often contained very large enhancements in 26Mg/24Mg from the decay of 26Al with 26Al/27Al sometimes approaching 0.2  These studies on micron scale grains were possible as a result of the development of surface ion mass spectrometry at high mass resolution with a focused beam developed by G. Slodzian & R.Castaing with the CAMECA Co.

The production of 26Al by cosmic ray interactions in unshielded materials is used as a monitor of the time of exposure to cosmic rays. The amounts are far below the initial inventory that is found in very early solar system debris.

See also
Isotopes of aluminium

Surface exposure dating

References

Isotopes of aluminium
Positron emitters
Radionuclides used in radiometric dating